On 19 December 2014, at 11:20 a.m., police were called to 34 Murray Street in the Cairns suburb of Manoora in Australia, where eight children were found dead. The victims were aged between 18 months and 14 years. The bodies, with stab wounds, were discovered by the children's 20-year-old brother. Neighbours reported that fighting could be heard from the house the night before and in the early hours of the morning.

Victims
Eight children were killed: four boys and four girls, ranging in age from two to 14 years old. Seven of the eight were siblings or half-siblings, and the eighth was their cousin. Their family had ties across Australia, including in Perth.

Perpetrator
Raina Mersane Ina Thaiday, also called Mersane Warria, was the mother of seven of the children and also the aunt of the eighth. Following the killings, she was hospitalised for self-inflicted wounds from the incident.

Thaiday is alleged to have said to her eldest son "I've killed them" when he visited the house at around 11:00 a.m. Police believe Thaiday drugged the children before the attack took place, as no one reported that they heard the victims during the attack. However, no drugs were found at the crime scene.

On 21 December 2014, she was charged with eight counts of murder.  Prior to Christmas, Thaiday was moved to a mental health facility in Brisbane, with a preliminary hearing to occur in Cairns on 30 January 2015. In April 2017, Queensland's Mental Health Court ruled that Thaiday was of "unsound mind" at the time of the killings, and thus (under Queensland law) not criminally responsible. , she is being held for treatment at The Park Centre for Mental Health.

Reactions
Tony Abbott, then Prime Minister of Australia, described the event as an "unspeakable crime." Queensland Premier Campbell Newman expressed his sadness and shock about the incident, adding "I ask that all Queenslanders reach out to those who may need support in coming days and do not hesitate to ask for professional assistance if needed". Cairns Region Mayor Bob Manning asked the "people of Cairns to unite and display sympathy for those directly affected by this incident and respect for the police and other authorities who now must go about this difficult work." The Torres Strait Island Regional Council requested respect for privacy and cultural responsibilities, adding it was inappropriate to comment due to "strict cultural protocols".

The children's funeral was held on 10 January 2015 at Cairns Convention Centre. The house was removed. Eight frangipani trees were planted on the site as a memorial.

References

2014 murders in Australia
Cairns, Queensland
Crime in Queensland
Deaths by stabbing in Australia
Filicides in Australia
Knife attacks
Mass murder in 2014
Mass murder in Australia
Mass stabbings
Stabbing attacks in 2014
Violence against children